Tarbinskiellus is a genus of crickets in the family Gryllidae and tribe Gryllini.  Species can be found in Asia.

Species 
Tarbinskiellus includes the following species:
Tarbinskiellus neotropicus Gorochov, 2001
Tarbinskiellus orientalis Fabricius, 1775
Tarbinskiellus portentosus Lichtenstein, 1796 - type species (as Acheta portentosa Lichtenstein AAH)
Tarbinskiellus terrificus Walker, 1869

References

External links
 
 

Ensifera genera
Gryllinae
Orthoptera of Asia